Kelly M. Alexander Jr. (born October 17, 1948) is a Democratic member of the North Carolina House of Representatives. He represents the 107th district. During the 2015 legislative session, Alexander is one of 22 African Americans in the North Carolina House of Representatives.

Alexander is the son of NAACP chair Kelly Alexander Sr. and nephew of civil rights activist Frederick Alexander.

He attended West Charlotte High School and University of North Carolina at Chapel Hill. Alexander returned to Charlotte after college to manage the Alexander Funeral Home. He has taught classes at Central Piedmont Community College, Johnson C. Smith University, Queens University of Charlotte and University of North Carolina at Charlotte.

Following in his father's footsteps, Alexander became President of the NC NAACP and served on the national NAACP board. He first ran for NC General Assembly in 2008 and won, taking his oath in 2009.

Alexander was the first African American to be appointed to the Airport Advisory Committee from 1978 to 1984. He was involved in preventing an NC amendment that would allow state assemblymen to serve for four terms instead of two.

Electoral history

2022

2020

2018

2016

2014

2012

2010

2008

References

External links
 Interview with Kelly Alexander Jr
 Kelly M Alexander Papers, J Murrey Atkins Library, UNC Charlotte.

1948 births
Living people
People from Charlotte, North Carolina
Politicians from Charlotte, North Carolina
University of North Carolina at Chapel Hill alumni
20th-century African-American people
21st-century American politicians
21st-century African-American politicians
African-American state legislators in North Carolina
Democratic Party members of the North Carolina House of Representatives